Joyelle McSweeney (first name meaning: Rejoicing) (born 1976) is a poet, playwright, novelist, critic, and professor at the University of Notre Dame. Her books include Toxicon & Arachne (2021) from Nightboat Books, The Necropastoral: Poetry, Media, Occults (2014) from University of Michigan Press, Salamandrine: 8 gothics (2013) and Nylund, the Sarcographer (2007), both from Tarpaulin Sky Press, as well as Percussion Grenade (2012), Flet (2007), The Commandrine and Other Poems (2004), and The Red Bird (2001), the latter four published by Fence Books. Her translations of Yi Sang: Selected Works (2020) were published alongside Don Mee Choi, Jack Jung, and Sawako Nakayasu by Wave Books. Her reviews appear at The Constant Critic and elsewhere, and her poetry has appeared in the Boston Review, Poetry magazine, Octopus Magazine, GultCult, and Tarpaulin Sky, among many other places. Along with her husband Johannes Göransson, she is the founder of Action Books which has published a number of contemporary authors including Lara Glenum, Tao Lin, Arielle Greenberg, and Hiromi Itō.  She recently added to The &NOW Awards 2: The Best Innovative Writing by &NOW Books, which released in May 2013.  She graduated from Harvard College (BA magna cum laude) as well as MPhil, Oxford University; MFA University of Iowa Writers Workshop

References

External links 
 Joyelle McSweeney author page at Nightboat Books 
 Book page for The Necropastoral at University of Michigan Press
 Action Books
 Joyelle McSweeney author page at Tarpaulin Sky Press
 
Joyelle McSweeney's poem "Charisma" in Gulf Coast: A Journal of Literature and Fine Arts (23.1).

American women poets
Living people
University of Notre Dame faculty
1976 births
Outlaw poets
Harvard College alumni
Iowa Writers' Workshop alumni
Alumni of the University of Oxford
21st-century American poets
American women academics
21st-century American women writers